Trevor Thomas Clarke (born 26 March 1998) is an Irish professional footballer who plays as a defender for Shamrock Rovers on loan from Bristol Rovers.

Club career

Early career
Clarke started his football career with Crumlin United, before moving to St. Kevin's Boys in the North Dublin suburb of Whitehall, the same club that produced a number of Republic of Ireland internationals, including Liam Brady, Damien Duff, Jeff Hendrick and Robbie Brady. His performances earned him a move to England with Middlesbrough, where he played for their Under-18's. He was released in July 2015 and returned home.

Shamrock Rovers
Clarke joined Shamrock Rovers in September 2015 from Middlesbrough. He played for the Rovers Under-19's for a short time before stepping up to the first team at the start of 2016. He made 80 league appearances for the club during the four seasons from 2016 to 2019, and also featured in the UEFA Europa League. In 2017 he was a transfer target for Southampton, Sheffield United and Barnsley.

Rotherham United
Clarke signed for Rotherham United on 29 July 2019, for an undisclosed fee, on a three-year contract. He was expected to be in contention for an immediate first-team place, but suffered a knee injury during a behind-closed-doors match on the same day his signing was announced. He finally made his debut in the 2019–20 EFL Trophy game against Doncaster Rovers on 8 October 2019, creating a goal and then scoring the winner.

Bristol Rovers
On 9 July 2021, Clarke joined League Two side Bristol Rovers on a one-year deal, signing for an undisclosed fee. Clarke made his debut for the club on the opening day of the season however was forced off with a groin injury after only 32 minutes. Clarke made his return from injury on 13 October when he played the first hour of an EFL Trophy defeat to Chelsea U21s. On 19 October he made his return to league action, coming off of the bench in the 82 minute before being shown a red card in the 91st minute for an off the ball incident with Junior Tchamadeu where Clarke was seen to throw a punch at his Colchester United counterpart, who was also sent off. Clarke's groin injury problems continued into the new year and in January he was again ruled out for over a month after undergoing surgery. Having achieved promotion on the final day of the 2021–22 season, Clarke signed a new two-year contract with the club with the option for a further year on 3 June 2022.

Clarke started the opening match of the season as Rovers were defeated 2–1 by Forest Green Rovers. Following the match Clarke's manager Joey Barton said that if he had been told at the end of the previous season that Clarke would have been included in the starting eleven, then his response would have been that the club "must have had a bad summer". On 4 August 2022, Barton revealed that Clarke was one of three players to be training away from the first-team that had been told that they can leave the club. With the transfer window drawing to a close however, Clarke was reintegrated back into the squad with a transfer away not having been found. On 4 October 2022, Clarke scored his first goal for the club when he fired home from the edge of the box on his weaker right foot in a 2–0 EFL Trophy victory over Crystal Palace U21. Having forced his way back into the team, a freak training injury for Clarke in December 2022 left him with a torn groin muscle, keeping him out of action until February 2023.

Shamrock Rovers (loan)
On 6 January 2023, Clarke returned to former club Shamrock Rovers on loan for the 2023 season.

International career
Clarke has played for Ireland from Under 15's level right up to the Republic of Ireland U21's, earning 12 caps & 5 goals for the Under 17's, 7 caps for Under 19's and 1 cap for the Under 21's.

Career statistics

Honours
Bristol Rovers
EFL League Two third-place promotion: 2021–22

Individual
 PFAI Young Player of the Year: 2017
 PFAI Premier Division Team of the Year: 2017

References 

1998 births
Living people
Association footballers from Dublin (city)
Republic of Ireland association footballers
Association football defenders
Association football midfielders
Crumlin United F.C. players
St. Kevin's Boys F.C. players
Shamrock Rovers F.C. players
Rotherham United F.C. players
Bristol Rovers F.C. players
League of Ireland players
English Football League players
Republic of Ireland expatriate association footballers
Irish expatriate sportspeople in England
Expatriate footballers in England